Brandon Grae Dubinsky (born April 29, 1986) is an American former professional ice hockey player. He previously played for the New York Rangers and Columbus Blue Jackets of the National Hockey League (NHL). Dubinsky was drafted 60th overall in the 2004 NHL Entry Draft by the Rangers.

Playing career
Dubinsky born in Russian American family, in Anchorage, Alaska. Played minor ice hockey in Anchorage, and Seattle through Sno-King Amateur Hockey Association, and graduated from Service High School in 2004. As a youth, he played in the 1999 Quebec International Pee-Wee Hockey Tournament with the Alaska All-Stars.

He played his junior career with Portland Winter Hawks of the Western Hockey League (WHL) for four years, and was a two-time Western Conference second team All-Star before being drafted in the second round of the 2004 NHL Draft by the New York Rangers.

New York Rangers
Dubinsky played for the Hartford Wolf Pack of the American Hockey League (AHL) for most of the 2006–07 season. He first played for the New York Rangers on March 8, 2007, against the New York Islanders.

Dubinsky scored his first NHL goal against Marc-André Fleury on November 8, 2007, in a 4–2 win against the Pittsburgh Penguins. Dubinsky was the 3rd star of the game. He spent much of the season centering the Rangers' first forward line with Jaromír Jágr and Sean Avery. He was one of sixteen rookies selected to participate in the 2008 YoungStars competition at the 56th NHL All-Star Game in Atlanta. He scored two goals and one assist and was named YoungStars Most Valuable Player. Dubinsky scored his first career playoff goal in the Eastern Conference Quarterfinals against the New Jersey Devils on April 13, 2008.

His successful rookie season was marked on April 4, 2008, when Dubinsky was awarded the Steven McDonald Extra Effort Award for the 2007–08 season and "Rookie of the Year" for the Rangers as voted by his teammates.

On May 12, 2008, Dubinsky scored a hat trick in his first World Championships, in Halifax, Nova Scotia, against Norway. Team USA went on to win the game 9–1.

On November 24, 2008, Dubinsky scored a Gordie Howe hat trick against the Phoenix Coyotes. He squared off against the Coyotes' tough guy Daniel Carcillo protecting the Rangers' netminder Henrik Lundqvist at 2:58 into the first, taking a five-minute major penalty for fighting. He then scored a wraparound goal 1 minute 15 seconds into the second period (which ended up being the game winner). Dubinsky then finished the "Gordie" with an assist to Dan Girardi, who scored a power play goal from the blue line at 7:37 into the third period. The Rangers won the game 4–1 and Dubinsky along with Lundqvist and Zherdev were named the three stars. Ranger coach Tom Renney called the feat a "Gordie Orr hat trick" claiming that Dubinsky "didn't do that well in the fight".

Dubinsky finished his second full season with one point more than his previous season.  Despite a strong start with a game-winning goal in the Rangers' first game  and a streak of 11 points in his first 11 games in 2008–09, he  suffered a 20-game goal-scoring drought.  On April 15, 2009, Dubinsky scored the game-winning goal with 8:17 remaining in the third period of the Rangers' first game of the 2009 Stanley Cup Playoffs, Eastern Conference Quarterfinals against the Washington Capitals.

After holding out at the beginning of the 2009–10 season and missing over a week of training camp, Dubinsky signed a two-year contract worth $3.7 million as a restricted free agent. Dubinsky tallied 3 goals and 10 points on the season before suffering a broken hand in a game against the Calgary Flames on November 7, 2009, which relegated him to the injured reserved list for more than a month.

Dubinsky returned to the Rangers' lineup on December 14 against the Atlanta Thrashers. Four games later, he scored his first goal in more than two months against the Carolina Hurricanes. The goal was the game-winner in a 3–1 Rangers victory. Despite missing over a month due to injury, Dubinsky finished the season with career highs in goals and points. After the 2010–11 season, Dubinsky avoided arbitration with the Rangers and signed a four-year, $16.8 million contract.

On July 23, 2012, Dubinsky was traded, along with Artem Anisimov, Tim Erixon, and a first round draft pick in 2013, to the Columbus Blue Jackets for Rick Nash, minor leaguer Steven Delisle and a conditional third round pick in the same draft. On July 11, 2014, Dubinsky signed a 6-year, $35.1 million contract extension with Columbus.

Columbus Blue Jackets
During the 2012–13 NHL lockout, Dubinsky played for the Alaska Aces of the ECHL and made his Blue Jackets debut once the NHL returned from the work stoppage.

Dubinsky was named an alternate captain of the Blue Jackets on October 8, 2015.

In October 2017 Dubinsky was stripped of his "A", by head coach John Tortorella, and it was given to defenceman Jack Johnson. During the 2017–18 season, Dubinsky suffered a fractured orbital during a fight with Zack Kassian of the Edmonton Oilers on December 12, 2017. He was subsequently placed on long term injured reserve.

Personal life
Dubinsky was born in Anchorage, Alaska.

Career statistics

Regular season and playoffs

International

Awards and honours

References

External links
 

1986 births
Alaska Aces (ECHL) players
American men's ice hockey centers
American people of Russian descent
Columbus Blue Jackets players
Hartford Wolf Pack players
Ice hockey people from Anchorage, Alaska
Living people
New York Rangers draft picks
New York Rangers players
Portland Winterhawks players